Statistics of the 2001–02 Saudi Premier League.

Stadia and locations

Final league table

Championship playoff

Fourth place game

Third place game

Final

External links 
 RSSSF Stats
 Saudi Arabia Football Federation
 Saudi League Statistics

Saudi Premier League seasons
Saudi Professional League
Professional League